Shouwang Township or Shouwang Hui Ethnic Township is a rural ethnic township in Zhaoyang District of Zhaotong, Yunnan, China. As of the 2015 census it had a population of 40,000. It is surrounded by Fenghuang Subdistrict on the north, Buga Hui Ethnic Township and Yongfeng Town on the west, Xiaolongdong Hui and Yi Ethnic Township on the east, and Zhongshui Town of Weining County on the south.

Administrative division

The township is divided into 7 villages:
 Shuijingwan Village
 Kaizi Village
 Baxian Village
 Huluping Village
 Ganhe Village
 Liujiahaizi Village
 Maguizha Village

Geography
Jingfeng Reservoir is a reservoir and the largest body of water in the township.

Climate

Economy
The main industries in and around the township are forestry and farming.

Religion
The locals believe in Islam and the township has 2 mosques: Baxian Mosque and Songjiashan Mosque, both were originally built in the Qing dynasty (1644–1911).

Transportation
Zhaoyang–Weining Road passes across the town.

References

Divisions of Zhaoyang District
Ethnic townships of the People's Republic of China